"All Prologue" is the sixth episode of the second season of the HBO original series The Wire. The episode was written by David Simon from a story by David Simon & Ed Burns and was directed by Steve Shill. It originally aired on July 6, 2003.

Plot
When Omar is called into court (without proper attire besides a flamboyant tie), he identifies Bird and the weapon used to kill William Gant. As they observe the trial, Stringer discusses with McNulty whether Omar truly did witness the Gant murder. Levy subjects Omar to a harsh cross-examination, but Omar quickly turns the attacks back on Levy. After the jury returns a guilty verdict, Judge Daniel Phelan refuses Levy's request for an appeal bond and states that he will almost certainly sentence Bird to life in prison. Afterward, McNulty asks Omar if he really saw Bird commit the murder. Omar responds, "You really askin'?".

Freamon tells Daniels that Frank lives within his means, while his stevedores union is in financial trouble. Freamon and Prez have found a paper trail through campaign finance records linking the union to $70,000 in contributions. Herc reports that they have had success making street-level hand-to-hands, but have found no ties between portside drug dealers and the union. Beadie suggests that the union is making extra money by facilitating smuggling through the port. Daniels reassigns Prez and Greggs to focus on the vice trade, and Freamon works with Russell and Bunk to look at container movements.

McNulty visits his wife at her real estate office and she agrees to go on a date with him on Friday night. When they go to dinner, McNulty drinks only wine and lies to Elena, claiming that he's not drinking so much anymore. She says she's still angry with him but when McNulty asks for a chance to reunite with her, she invites him to bed instead. Later, over drinks, Bunk laments the pressure he feels from Rawls, while McNulty says he wants to make another go of things with Elena.

Greggs meets with Shardene Innes for help tracking down Eastern European girls working in the vice trade. She discusses her strip club assignment with Cheryl, who is angry that Greggs has returned to detective work and insists on accompanying her. A friend of Shardene's tells the detectives that there is a madam who organizes the girls and keeps them at a motel, where they are under guard when not working. After visiting the club, Greggs takes Cheryl to the port and explains how the Jane Does died. Beadie shows Bunk and Daniels how to track container movements on the computer. Beadie and Freamon are able to tie the missing containers to Horseface.

Nick asks Vondas for help in resolving Ziggy's problems with Cheese. Nick later tags along with Serge to the latter's meeting with Cheese and watches from the car as Serge and his associates draw guns on Cheese's crew. Serge then arranges a meeting in which Proposition Joe agrees to compensate Ziggy for the torched car. However, Joe makes it clear that Ziggy and Nick would both be dead if not for their association with the Greeks. Nick, Ziggy, and Johnny Fifty deliver the chemicals in exchange for drugs. Tempted by the additional payoff and Ziggy's pleas, Nick opts to take half the payment in cash and the rest in drugs. After a union meeting, Nick goes to the bar and gives Ziggy his compensation. Ziggy ostentatiously lights a cigarette with a $100 bill, causing Frank to leave in disgust. Outside, he asks Ziggy where he got his money and how he got his bruises.

Stringer delivers an envelope of cash to Leech, a contact from Washington, D.C., concerning a contract killing. Brianna visits D'Angelo and tries to persuade him to use Avon's set-up of Tilghman to shave time from his sentence. D'Angelo refuses, reminding his mother that she taught him to stand up for himself. He tells her to let him deal with things on his own and to take the fall for the Barksdale Organization. He then asks her to tell Stringer, Avon, and Donette to leave him alone.  D'Angelo passes Avon in the corridor and refuses to talk to him. While working in the prison library, D'Angelo is followed by an inmate named Mugs. Mugs garrotes D'Angelo with a leather strap, then ties it to a doorknob and places D'Angelo's hands in his pants, making his death appear to be the result of suicide.

Production

Epigraph

D'Angelo makes this comment when discussing F. Scott Fitzgerald's novel The Great Gatsby and the theme of Gatsby's inability to escape his past and who he was no matter how much he tried to cover it, a sentiment that D'Angelo shares as he is unable to escape that he is a Barksdale. It also refers to Jimmy McNulty's attempts at reconciliation with his wife.

Credits

Starring cast
Although credited, John Doman and Deirdre Lovejoy do not appear in this episode.

Guest stars
Seth Gilliam as Detective Ellis Carver
Domenick Lombardozzi as Detective Thomas "Herc" Hauk
Jim True-Frost as Detective Roland "Prez" Pryzbylewski
James Ransone as Ziggy Sobotka
Pablo Schreiber as Nick Sobotka
Melanie Nicholls-King as Cheryl
Callie Thorne as Elena McNulty
Michael K. Williams as Omar Little
Michael Hyatt as Brianna Barksdale
Michael Kostroff as Maurice Levy
Susan Rome as ASA Ilene Nathan
Robert F. Chew as Proposition Joe
Wendy Grantham as Shardene Innes
Lev Gorens as Eton Ben-Eleazer
Charley Scalies as Thomas "Horseface" Pakusa
Fredro Starr as Marquis "Bird" Hilton
Chris Ashworth as Sergei Malatov
Luray Cooper as Nat Coxson
Erik Todd Dellums as ME Randall Frazier
Jeffrey Fugitt as Officer Claude Diggins
Richard Price as book group leader

Uncredited appearances
Peter Gerety as Judge Daniel Phelan
Harold L. Able, Sr. as Moonshot
J. Valenteen Gregg as Chess
Doug Lory as Little Big Roy
Bus Howard as Vernon "Ott" Mottley
Jeffrey Pratt Gordon as Johnny "Fifty" Spamanto
Dakota Anderson as Mugs
Jacques Derosena as Leech
Toni Hunter as Stripper

First appearances
Eton Ben-Eleazer: Israeli lieutenant in charge of The Greek's drug supply operation.

Reception
Omar Little's courtroom scene in this episode has been described as the character's "defining scene" and was among actor Michael K. Williams' favorites.

The Futon Critic named it the ninth best episode of 2003, saying "There's simply been nobody like Omar (Michael K. Williams) on television before and he absolutely steals the show in this episode as he's called on to testify for the D.A.'s office. After being grilled by the defense for his less than moral activities, Omar responds with an amazing, funny and cheer inducing monologue about the legal system."

The episode was also praised as a 'seminal moment for the series'.  The tragic death of D'Angelo Barksdale was highlighted, with one reviewer stating that the episode drew on the show's 'incredible wealth of character and story background' to 'forge a powerfully emotional and meaningful episode'.

Ratings
The episode drew an average of 4.11 million viewers and was the second most watched program on cable television (after lead-in Sex and The City) for the week ending July 7, 2003.

References

External links
"All Prologue" at HBO.com

The Wire (season 2) episodes
2003 American television episodes
Television episodes written by David Simon